Willis Todhunter Ballard (December 13, 1903 – December 27, 1980) was an American writer, known for his Westerns and mystery novels.

Pseudonyms

Ballard was a prolific pulp writer, most notably for the legendary mystery magazine Black Mask under the name W.T. Ballard. He also authored several mystery and crime novels under that name. Ballard wrote western novels as Todhunter Ballard and the following pseudonyms: Jack Slade, Hunter D'Allard, Clay Turner, John Hunter, Sam Bowie, Parker Bonner, Brian Fox, and Clint Reno. He wrote numerous teleplays for shows such as Death Valley Days and Shannon.

Personal
Ballard was born on December 13, 1903, in Cleveland, Ohio.

Ballard attended schools in Cleveland and Westtown, Pennsylvania.  In 1926 he graduated  from Wilmington College, Wilmington, Ohio. He was married to Phoebe Dwiggins, daughter of Clare Victor Dwiggins, the popular American cartoonist known as "Dwig."

He died December 27, 1980.

Work

Ballard wrote thousands of magazine stories and over fifty television scripts.  Almost all of these stories were in the mystery or western genre. 
Ballard died on December 27, 1980, in Mount Dora, Florida.

Partial bibliography

Mysteries/Crime
 Say Yes to Murder (1942)
 Murder Can't Stop (1947)
 Murder in Hollywood (1951)
 Walk in Fear (1952)
 Chance Elson (1958)
 Murder Las Vegas Style (1958)
 Fury in the Heart (1959)
 Pretty Miss Murder (1961)
 The Seven Sisters (1962)
 Mexican Slay Ride (1962)
 Three for the Money (1963)

Westerns
 Two-Edged Vengeance (1951) aka The Circle C Feud (1952)
 Incident at Sun Mountain (1952)
 West of Quarantine (1953)
 High Iron (1953)
 Oulaw Brand (1954) as Parker Bonner
 Trigger Trail (1955)
 Guns of the Lawless (1956)
 Trail Town Marshall (1957)
 The Marshall from Deadwood (1958) as John Hunter
 Trouble on the Massacre (1959)
 The Night Riders (1961)
 The Long Sword (1962) as Hunter D'Allard
 Gopher Gold (1962)
 Desperation Valley (1964)
 Gold in California! (1965)
 Lassiter (1968) as Jack Slade
 The Wild Bunch (1969) as Brian Fox
 Sabata (1969) as Brian Fox
 A Western Bonanza: Eight Short Novels of the West (1969)
 Chisum  (1970) as Sam Bowie
 The Californian  (1971)
 Nowhere Left to Run (1972)
 Loco and the Wolf (1973)
 Home to Texas (1974)
 Sierra Massacre (1974) as Clint Reno
 Trails of Rage (1975)
 The Sheriff of Tombstone (1977)
 Lost Gold: A Western Duo

Awards

Spur Award, 1965 for ‘’Gold in California!’’.

References

External links

1903 births
1980 deaths
Writers from Cleveland
Wilmington College (Ohio) alumni
Western (genre) writers
20th-century American novelists
American mystery writers
American male novelists
People from Mount Dora, Florida
20th-century American male writers
Novelists from Ohio